Nischwitz Stadium is a baseball venue located in Fairborn, Ohio, United States.  It is home to the Wright State Raiders baseball team of the NCAA's Division I Horizon League.  The facility has chairback seating for 750 spectators.

The stadium is named for Ron Nischwitz and Gregg Nischwitz.  Ron coached the program for 30 years, and his son Gregg played one season for the Raiders.  However, he died in a 1980 construction accident.  The stadium, built in 1993, was dedicated in their honor on April 12, 2000, during a Wright State game against Indiana.

In fall 2012, a FieldTurf surface was installed at the field.

Events
Nischwitz hosted the 2006, 2011, 2016, 2018, and 2021 Horizon League baseball tournaments.

See also
 List of NCAA Division I baseball venues

References

College baseball venues in the United States
Baseball venues in Ohio
Wright State Raiders baseball
Sports venues in Dayton, Ohio
1993 establishments in Ohio
Sports venues completed in 1993